Justo Arosemena Lacayo (March 31, 1929, Panama City - October 12, 2000) was a Colombian sculptor born in Panama and based in the city of Medellin.

1929 births
2000 deaths
People from Panama City
Colombian artists
Panamanian emigrants to Colombia